Woodville is a census-designated place in Leon County, Florida, United States, just south of Tallahassee, Florida. The population was 2,978 at the 2010 census. It is part of the Tallahassee, Florida Metropolitan Statistical Area.  The American Civil War Battle of Natural Bridge, in March 1865, occurred in what is now Woodville, at the Natural Bridge (approximately six miles from Woodville proper).  This is where the St. Marks River drops into a sinkhole, the Natural Bridge Sink and flows underground, reemerging  later.

Geography
Woodville is located at  (30.307453, -84.252215).

Demographics

2020 census

As of the 2020 United States census, there were 4,097 people, 1,475 households, and 1,106 families residing in the CDP.

2000 census
As of the census of 2000, there were 3,006 people, 1,182 households, and 855 families residing in the CDP. The racial makeup of the CDP was 79.34% White, 18.30% African American, 0.70% Native American, 0.13% Asian, 0.27% from other races, and 1.26% from two or more races. Hispanic or Latino of any race were 2.00% of the population.

There were 1,182 households, out of which 32.0% had children under the age of 18 living with them, 50.7% were married couples living together, 15.4% had a female householder with no husband present, and 27.6% were non-families. 21.7% of all households were made up of individuals, and 7.0% had someone living alone who was 65 years of age or older. The average household size was 2.54 and the average family size was 2.92.

In the CDP, the population was spread out, with 25.1% under the age of 18, 8.8% from 18 to 24, 29.2% from 25 to 44, 26.3% from 45 to 64, and 10.6% who were 65 years of age or older. The median age was 37 years. For every 100 females, there were 95.6 males. For every 100 females age 18 and over, there were 92.0 males.

The median income for a household in the CDP was $38,946, and the median income for a family was $42,026. Males had a median income of $26,495 versus $27,237 for females. The per capita income for the CDP was $19,915. About 6.2% of families and 10.7% of the population were below the poverty line, including 19.0% of those under age 18 and 2.8% of those age 65 or over.

Climate
The climate in this area is characterized by hot, humid summers and generally mild to cool winters.  According to the Köppen Climate Classification system, Woodville has a humid subtropical climate, abbreviated "Cfa" on climate maps.

References

External links
1940 Woodville map

Census-designated places in Leon County, Florida
Tallahassee metropolitan area
Census-designated places in Florida